Halla Pai Huhm (alternately, Halla Huhm, Pai Halla, or Pae Yŏng-ja; 1922–1994) was a Korean-American dancer and the most well-known teacher of Korean dance in Hawaii. She established the Halla Pai Huhm dance studio, and after her death, the Halla Pai Huhm Foundation's Dance Collection was started from her collection of documents, photographs, and recordings. The archival collection was named a U.S. Irreplaceable Dance Treasure in 2001.

Biography

Early life and education 
Born in Busan, Pai Huhm moved to Japan with four siblings when she was five and was raised by her father's niece, Pai Ku-ja. Pai was a dancer who taught Huhm the foundations of modern, Japanese, and Korean dance, and passed the name "Pai" to her. Huhm then studied ballet and modern dance in Europe while studying for a Bachelor's degree at Jitsen University. When World War II broke out, she returned to Korea. She studied Korean dance with Han Sung-jin and other masters, and continued her studies even after she immigrated to Hawaii in 1949. Huhm would regularly travel back to Korea as part of her job at a travel agency, and used this time to further her studies.

Honolulu 
Huhm moved to Hawaii in 1949 to follow her husband, a Korean-American soldier. Huhm first appeared in Honolulu's theater scene during a production of Teahouse of the Autumn Moon at the Honolulu Community Theatre in 1954. She started teaching Korean dance informally in 1950, but by 1960 she had established a dance studio. She struggled to keep it open due to lack of financial support. This can be attributed to a belief at the time that only kisaeng dance. The studio's early struggles could also be attributed to local Koreans view that Huhm was "too Japanese" because she spoke fluent Japanese and got along well with members of the Japanese community. She kept the studio afloat using funds from her job at a travel agency.

In 1959, she began teaching Korean dance at the University of Hawaii at Manoa. She stopped teaching at the University in the 1970s, but maintained close ties with their Korean Studies Center. In 1983 she taught Korean dance at the Chongju University of Education. Huhm taught dance not only to preserve Korean dance in Hawaii, but also to pass on the traditions and values of her culture.

Some of her most well-known collaborations were with Chun Hyung Kim, a dancer specializing in Korean court dances; and Ji San Lee, a shaman.

Legacy 
The Halla Pai Huhm Korean Dance Studio is "the only continuous source of Korean dance and music in the United States". Huhm was the first recipient of the Outstanding Korean in Hawaii award. She also received a cultural medal from the South Korean government in 1980. Huhm died in 1994, and her memory was celebrated during several dance events planned by Mary Jo Freshley.

The Halla Pai Huhm Foundation was named in her honor, and includes the studio she ran. It also includes an archive of documents and memorabilia Huhm collected. The archival collection was named a U.S. Irreplaceable Dance Treasure in 2001, and received grants to preserve the items in Hawaii's humid climate.

In 2013, Billie Lee made a documentary on Halla's work entitled, "Moving Home: The Legacy of Halla Pai Huhm."

Selected works
1980, Kut, Korean shamanist rituals

See also 
 Ha Soo Whang

References

External links 

 Halla Pai Huhm Dance Collection finding aid

1922 births
1994 deaths
Korean expatriates in the United States
Korean female dancers
History of Hawaii
People from Busan
Women religious writers
20th-century South Korean women writers
20th-century South Korean writers